The 39th Golden Raspberry Awards was an awards ceremony that honored  the worst the film industry had to offer in 2018. The Golden Raspberry Awards, also known as the Razzies, are awarded based on votes from members of the Golden Raspberry Foundation. The nominees were announced on January 21, 2019 and the winners were announced on February 23, 2019.

Winners and nominees

{|class=wikitable
|-
| valign="top" width="50%"|

 Holmes & Watson (Columbia) – Will Ferrell, Adam McKay, Jimmy Miller, Clayton Townsend Gotti (Vertical Entertainment) – Randall Emmett, Marc Fiore, Michael Froch, George Furla
 The Happytime Murders (STX) – Ben Falcone, Jeffrey Hayes, Brian Henson, Melissa McCarthy
 Robin Hood (Summit) – Jennifer Davisson, Leonardo DiCaprio
 Winchester (Lionsgate) – Tim McGahan, Brett Tomberlin
| valign="top" width="50%"|

 Etan Cohen – Holmes & Watson
 Kevin Connolly – Gotti
 James Foley – Fifty Shades Freed
 Brian Henson – The Happytime Murders
 The Spierig Brothers – Winchester
|-
| valign="top" width="50%"|

 Donald Trump – Death of a Nation and Fahrenheit 11/9 as himself
 Johnny Depp (voice only) – Sherlock Gnomes as Sherlock Gnomes
 Will Ferrell – Holmes & Watson as Sherlock Holmes
 John Travolta – Gotti as John Gotti
 Bruce Willis – Death Wish as Paul Kersey
| valign="top" width="50%"|

 Melissa McCarthy – The Happytime Murders as Detective Connie Edwards and Life of the Party as Deanna Miles
 Jennifer Garner – Peppermint as Riley North
 Amber Heard – London Fields as Nicola Six
 Helen Mirren – Winchester as Sarah Winchester
 Amanda Seyfried – The Clapper as Judy
|-
| valign="top" width="50%"|

 John C. Reilly – Holmes & Watson as Dr. John Watson
 Chris "Ludacris" Bridges (voice only) – Show Dogs as Max
 Jamie Foxx – Robin Hood as Little John
 Joel McHale – The Happytime Murders as Special Agent Campbell
 Justice Smith – Jurassic World: Fallen Kingdom as Franklin Webb
| valign="top" width="50%"|

 Kellyanne Conway – Fahrenheit 11/9 as herself
 Marcia Gay Harden – Fifty Shades Freed as Grace Trevelyan Grey
 Kelly Preston – Gotti as Victoria Gotti
 Jaz Sinclair – Slender Man as Chloe
 Melania Trump – Fahrenheit 11/9 as herself 
|-
| valign="top" width="50%"|

 Donald Trump  & "His Self Perpetuating Pettiness" – Death of a Nation and Fahrenheit 11/9
 Any two actors or puppets – The Happytime Murders
 Johnny Depp & his fast-fading film career – Sherlock Gnomes
 Will Ferrell & John C. Reilly – Holmes & Watson
 Kelly Preston & John Travolta – Gotti
| valign="top" width="50%"|

 Holmes & Watson – (Columbia) Death of a Nation – (Quality Flix) (Remake of Hillary's America)
 Death Wish – (Metro-Goldwyn-Mayer)
 The Meg – (Warner Bros.) (Rip-off of Jaws)
 Robin Hood – (Summit)
|-
| valign="top" width="50%"|

 Fifty Shades Freed – Niall Leonard; based on the novel by E. L. James
 Death of a Nation – Dinesh D'Souza and Bruce Schooley; based on The Big Lie and Death of a Nation by D'Souza
 Gotti – Lem Dobbs and Leo Rossi
 The Happytime Murders – Todd Berger; story by Berger and Dee Austin Robertson
 Winchester – The Spierig Brothers and Tom Vaughan
| valign="top" width="50%"|

 Melissa McCarthy – Can You Ever Forgive Me?
 Peter Farrelly – Green Book Tyler Perry – Vice The Transformers franchise – Bumblebee Sony Pictures Animation – Spider-Man: Into the Spider-Verse|-
| valign="top" width="50%"|

 Billionaire Boys Club|}

Films with multiple wins and nominations
The following films received multiple nominations:

The following films received multiple wins:

 Criticism 
On January 31, 2019, the ceremony was accused of rigging the vote tallies for its nominees. For example, Jamie Dornan (Fifty Shades Freed) and Kevin Spacey (Billionaire Boys Club) received enough votes for Worst Actor, but neither were included on the final nominee list. 

The ballot itself was also heavily criticized for overlook critically panned films and the nomination and win of non-acting performances for documentary stock footage.

Despite mix-to-poor reviews, the awards was criticized for nominating The Meg in the Worst Remake, Rip-off or Sequel as a rip-off of Steven Spielberg's film Jaws'' despite having nothing to do with the film besides having a shark as an antagonist.

See also
 91st Academy Awards
 76th Golden Globe Awards
 72nd British Academy Film Awards
 34th Independent Spirit Awards
 25th Screen Actors Guild Awards
 24th Critics' Choice Awards
 45th Saturn Awards

References

External links
 

Golden Raspberry Awards ceremonies
Golden Raspberry
Golden Raspberry
2019 in Los Angeles
February 2019 events in the United States
Events in Los Angeles